Tricliceras elatum is a distylous herb native to northern Mozambique, Africa.  As of 2020, T. elatum has been classified as endangered.

References 

Passifloraceae